Hans Christian Harboe Grønn (9 January 1829 – 18 February 1902) was a Norwegian barrister and politician.

Career
Grønn was barrister with access to work with the Supreme Court. He served as Attorney General of Norway from 1870 to 1873.

He was elected representative to the Storting from the constituency Kristiania, Hønefos og Kongsvinger for the period 1877–1879.

References

1829 births
1902 deaths
Norwegian jurists
Members of the Storting